Do Gush (also Romanized as Do Gūsh) is a village in Mazraeh Now Rural District, in the Central District of Ashtian County, Markazi Province, Iran. At the 2006 census, its population was 9, in 4 families.

References 

Populated places in Ashtian County